Fair is a type of market, or fête.

Fair or FAIR (acronym) may also refer to:

Fair 
 Trade fair, or expo, a trade show
 Fair, a level in coin grading
 Fair, hair color of a fair haired (blonde) person
 Fair (band), a music group
 "Fair" (song), a 2022 song by Normani
 Fair ball, in baseball, a batted ball which is in play

Surname

FAIR (acronym)
 Factor analysis of information risk, a framework for understanding, analyzing, and measuring information risks by the company Risk Management Insight
 FAIR data, data which meet standards of findability, accessibility, interoperability and reusability
 First article inspection report, a formal method of providing a measurement report for a given manufacturing process

Germany 
 Facility for Antiproton and Ion Research, an international accelerator facility for the research using antiprotons and ions

United Kingdom 
 Families Acting for Innocent Relatives, in Northern Ireland 
 Family Action Information Resource, a British anti-cult group, reorganized as The Family Survival Trust
 Forum Against Islamophobia and Racism

United States 
 Fairness and Accuracy in Reporting, a progressive media criticism organization based in New York City
 Federation for American Immigration Reform
 Forum for Academic and Institutional Rights
 Foundation Against Intolerance and Racism
 FAIR (Mormon apologetics organization), formerly known as FairMormon and the Foundation for Apologetic Information & Research

See also 
 The Fair (disambiguation)
 Fairness (disambiguation)
 Fairing (disambiguation)
 Fairs (surname)
 Unfair (disambiguation)